This is a list of the former Soviet tank factories. Today most of them are located in the Russian Federation, while only the Malyshev Factory is located in Ukraine.

This list includes the heavy steel manufacturing plants where main production and assembly of medium and heavy armoured vehicles took place, initiated first in the late 1920s as a prerequisite for the developing Red Army doctrine that called for large tank forces. It does not list the related facilities which fabricated components for them, the many lighter automotive industries which built light tracked vehicles and armoured cars, nor the armoured vehicle repair and overhaul plants.

Keeping track of the tank factories can be difficult.  Many were based on pre-Soviet imperial Russian shipbuilding or locomotive factories, and may have changed names more than once.  The majority were evacuated and consolidated in the Urals in the fall of 1941, shortly after the disastrous German invasion of June 22.  After World War II, some remained in their new location, others were moved back or re-established at other factories.  Most were also known by their designation numbers as well as honorific names.

English translations of the factory names can also be confusing.  In various sources, the Russian "завод" is translated either as "factory", "plant", "works", or simply transliterated as "zavod".

List

See also 
 GABTU
 Soviet armored fighting vehicle production during World War II

References

Bibliography 
 Zaloga, Steven J. and James Grandsen (1984). Soviet Tanks and Combat Vehicles of World War Two. London: Arms and Armour Press. .

External links 
 Compass in the world of machines and machine-building (in Russian)

Defence companies of the Soviet Union